Selnes was a  cargo ship that was built in 1928 as Gemma by Flensburger Schiffbau-Gesellschaft, Flensburg, Germany for German owners. A sale in 1929 saw her renamed Peter Vith. She was seized by the Allies in May 1945, passed to the Ministry of War Transport (MoWT) and was renamed Empire Constitution. In 1946, she was transferred to Norway and renamed Grannes and then Selnes following a further sale later that year. In 1950, she was involved in a collision in the Thames Estuary and was declared a total loss.

Description
The ship was built in 1928 by Flensburger Schiffbau-Gesellschaft, Flensburg.

The ship had a GRT of 1,593 and a NRT of 946.

The engine was built by Flensburger Schiffbau-Gesellschaft.

History
Gemma was built for Holm & Molzen, Hamburg. In 1929, she was sold to H P Vith GmbH, Flensburg and renamed Peter Vith. Her port of registry was Flensburg. The Code Letters LNTQ were allocated. In 1934, her Code Letters were changed to DDTV. On 24 January 1934, Peter Vith was in collision with the German pilot boat Ditmar Köel off the Elbe I Lightvessel in foggy weather. In 1936, Peter Vith was one of 20 ships chartered to transport timber from Leningrad, Soviet Union to Germany.

In May 1945, Memel was seized by the Allies at Flensburg. She was passed to the MoWT and renamed Empire Constellation. Her port of registry was changed to London and she was placed under the management of W A Souter & Co Ltd. The Code Letters GFYC and United Kingdom Official Number 1806444 were allocated. In 1946, Empire Constellation was transferred to Norway, and was renamed Grannes. She was sold later that year to Einar Wahlstrom and renamed Selnes. Although she was beached on the West Barrow Sands, she was declared a total loss.

References

1928 ships
Ships built in Flensburg
Steamships of Germany
Merchant ships of Germany
World War II merchant ships of Germany
Ministry of War Transport ships
Empire ships
Steamships of the United Kingdom
Merchant ships of the United Kingdom
Steamships of Norway
Merchant ships of Norway
Maritime incidents in 1950